Destiny's Child: The Untold Story Presents Girls Tyme is a compilation album of songs by American R&B girl group Destiny's Child, then called Girls Tyme, released on December 2, 2019 through Trinitee Urban Records. The album features music recorded by Destiny's Child members during the early development of their career as a children's group.

Background 
On October 25, 2019, Destiny's Child's former manager Mathew Knowles announced via an Instagram video that he would release an album featuring then-unreleased music from the group's childhood days as Girls Tyme. The video ended with the intertitle “Destiny's Child: The Untold Story. Girls Tyme. December 2019."

The album was released on all streaming platforms and the iTunes Store on December 2, 2019. The album's release was also accompanied by a book, Destiny's Child: The Untold Story, written by Matthew Knowles and Star Jackson. On June 18, 2020, the audiobook was released on Audible, and is narrated by Mathew Knowles, Leon Derrick Youngblood Sr and Jackie Burgess.

Track listing

References 

Compilation albums by American artists
Destiny's Child albums
2019 compilation albums